Paratrichapus sechellarum is a species of beetle in the family Ciidae, the only species in the genus Paratrichapus.

References

Ciidae genera